Óscar Montalbán Ramos (born 17 May 1976), known as Rubio, is a Spanish former footballer who played as a central defender, and is a manager.

Club career

Spain
After playing several years in the lower leagues, Rubio signed with Real Madrid in 1998, spending the vast majority of his spell in the Segunda División B with the reserves. He made his only appearance for the first team in the 1998–99 edition of the Copa del Rey, against Valencia CF: after a 6–0 away loss, he featured in the second leg, an insufficient 2–1 win.

Rubio was loaned to CP Mérida for 1999–2000, failing to appear in a single match. In January 2000, he was released by Madrid and joined CD Toledo also of Segunda División– both clubs would be relegated at the end of the season, the former due to financial irregularities.

Livingston
Rubio spent his first year in top-flight football with Portugal's S.C. Farense, playing less than half of the Primeira Liga games as his team finished in 13th position. He signed for Scottish Premier League side Livingston in July 2001, going on to make a total of 148 official appearances for them over the next four years and score eight goals.

In the 2001–02 campaign, Rubio appeared in 33 matches as the Livi Lions finished in a best-ever third place, with the subsequent qualification for the UEFA Cup. He then made history by becoming the first ever Livingston player to score in a European competition, when he netted a header in the club's first game, a 1–1 draw at FC Vaduz (eventual away goals rule qualification). He contributed to the team's victorious run in the Scottish League Cup in 2003–04, including starting and finishing the final against Hibernian.

Later years
Rubio left Livingston in July 2005 and moved back to his country, spending one season in the third tier with Rayo Vallecano. He retired in 2009 at the age of 33 after three years with amateurs Galáctico Pegaso, also in his native Madrid.

References

External links

1976 births
Living people
Spanish footballers
Footballers from Madrid
Association football defenders
Segunda División players
Segunda División B players
Tercera División players
RSD Alcalá players
RCD Mallorca B players
Real Madrid Castilla footballers
Real Madrid CF players
CP Mérida footballers
CD Toledo players
Rayo Vallecano players
Primeira Liga players
S.C. Farense players
Scottish Premier League players
Livingston F.C. players
Spanish expatriate footballers
Expatriate footballers in Portugal
Expatriate footballers in Scotland
Spanish expatriate sportspeople in Portugal
Spanish expatriate sportspeople in Scotland
Spanish football managers
Tercera División managers